Cricket flour (or cricket powder) is a protein-rich powder made from crickets, using various processes. Cricket flour differs from true flours made from grains by being composed mainly of protein rather than starches and dietary fiber.

Nutritional information 
Cricket flour contains nutrients such as the nine essential amino acids, calcium, iron, potassium, vitamin B12, B2, and fatty acids.

Food safety and processing 

When cultivated for human consumption in Western nations, insects are held to the same safety requirements as any other food.

Depending on the popularity in a given location, processing might be done commercially or locally. The procedure begins with the removal of the insect's insides, albeit this step is optional. They are then dispatched to be preserved or freeze-dried, which is accomplished using hessian or polypropylene. They are transported for storage once they have been entirely preserved/dried. Insects can be frozen or ground into powders.

Cricket flour is produced from freeze-dried crickets. The crickets are then cooked to facilitate processing. They are pulverised into extremely fine bits after being cooked. The freezing, baking, and drying results in a powdered dark brown flour.

Cost 
Prices can vary depending on location, but the average cost of pre-made cricket flour is around $40 per pound (4,200 to 4,800 crickets). The price is high due to limited commercializing and processors. Cricket flour is sold in limited areas, but mainly online and wholesale stores.

The average prices for frozen crickets are about $9 per pound. These can be utilized to make cricket flour at home.

Food products with cricket flour 
Pulverized freeze-dried crickets are used in processed food products, such as:

 pasta
 bread
 cookies
 snacks (chips, nachos)
 smoothies

Cricket flour can be utilized as a complete replacement for flour. The taste is described as very nutty, and foods normally prepared with wheat flour may cook differently.

Allergies 
People with shellfish allergies may need to use caution when consuming cricket flour. Also, there is a risk of contact with pathogens with consuming raw insects.

See also

Insects as food
Pea protein
Hemp protein
Entomophagy
Meat analogue

References

Flour
Flour
Insects as food